Sébastien Rose (born June 30, 1969, in Montreal, Quebec) is a Canadian film director and screenwriter. His debut film, How My Mother Gave Birth to Me During Menopause (Comment ma mère accoucha de moi durant sa ménopause), won the Claude Jutra Award for the best Canadian film by a first-time director in 2003.

Filmography
 How My Mother Gave Birth to Me During Menopause (Comment ma mère accoucha de moi durant sa ménopause) — 2003
 Life with My Father (La Vie avec mon père) — 2005
 Le Banquet — 2008
 Before My Heart Falls (Avant que mon cœur bascule) — 2012

References

External links

1969 births
Best First Feature Genie and Canadian Screen Award winners
Canadian screenwriters in French
Film directors from Montreal
Living people
Writers from Montreal